Frank Gay Clarke (September 10, 1850 – January 9, 1901) was an American politician, lawyer, and a United States Representative from New Hampshire.

Early life
Born in Wilton, Hillsborough County, New Hampshire, Clarke attended Kimball Union Academy in Meriden, New Hampshire, and earned a Bachelor of Science degree from Dartmouth College in Hanover, New Hampshire, in 1873. He studied law and was admitted to the bar in 1876. He began his practice in Peterborough.

Career
Clarke served as member of the New Hampshire House of Representatives in 1885. He was appointed Colonel on the military staff of Governor Hale and served in that capacity from 1885 to 1887. He was elected and served in the New Hampshire Senate in 1889; was elected to the New Hampshire House of Representatives in 1891, and was chosen Speaker of that body.

Elected as a Republican to the Fifty-fifth and Fifty-sixth Congresses, Clarke served as United States Representative for the second district of New Hampshire from March 4, 1897, until his death.

Death
Clarke died of an aneurysm in Peterborough on January 9, 1901 (age 50 years, 121 days). He is interred at Pine Hill Cemetery, Peterborough.

Family life
Son of Moses and Julia Gay, Clarke married Frances A. Brooks on May 13, 1875 and they had one daughter, Mabel Frances.

See also
List of United States Congress members who died in office (1900–49)

References

External links

1850 births
1901 deaths
Dartmouth College alumni
Speakers of the New Hampshire House of Representatives
Republican Party members of the New Hampshire House of Representatives
Republican Party New Hampshire state senators
Republican Party members of the United States House of Representatives from New Hampshire
19th-century American politicians
People from Wilton, New Hampshire
People from Peterborough, New Hampshire